Stoyba is a rural locality (a selo) in Selemdzhinsky District, Amur Oblast, Russia. The population was 687 as of 2018. There are 20 streets.

Geography 
Stoyba is located 113 km southwest of Ekimchan (the district's administrative centre) by road. Selemdzhinsk is the nearest rural locality.

References 

Rural localities in Selemdzhinsky District